Cornelius Davis Washington (born September 10, 1989) is an American football coach and former defensive end who is currently the Recruiting Communications Coordinator for the Washington Huskies football team. He was drafted by the Chicago Bears in the sixth round of the 2013 NFL Draft out of Georgia. He also played for the Detroit Lions.

Early years
Washington was a standout athlete for the Waynesboro (GA) Burke Co. track team. He was timed at 10.94 seconds in the 100 meters. He also competed in the shot put, he had a career-best throw of 13.75 meters.

College career
With the Georgia Bulldogs, Washington recorded 76 tackles, 17 tackles-for-loss and 10.5 sacks, while starting 25 of the 51 games he appeared in. During the 2012 SEC Championship Game against Alabama, Washington blocked a field goal, which was recovered by teammate Alec Ogletree, who returned the blocked kick 55 yards for a touchdown.

Professional career

At the combine, Washington led linebackers in the 225-pound bench press with 36 repetitions.

Chicago Bears
Washington was drafted by the Chicago Bears in the sixth-round (188th overall) to play exclusively at left defensive end. He and fifth-round pick Jordan Mills signed four-year contracts with the team on May 1, 2013.

Washington appeared in two games in the 2013 season, both against the Detroit Lions, making his NFL debut on September 29 against the Lions, recording a tackle.

In Week 12 of the 2014 season against the Tampa Bay Buccaneers, Washington recorded his first career sack.

On September 13, 2015, during the regular-season opener against the Green Bay Packers, Washington suffered a season-ending quadriceps injury and was placed on injured reserve.

Detroit Lions
On March 10, 2017, Washington signed a two-year, $6 million contract with the Detroit Lions. He played in 15 games in 2017, recording a career-high 24 tackles, 2.5 sacks, and three passes defensed.

On August 20, 2018, Washington was released by the Lions.

NFL career statistics

Post-playing career
In September 2019, Washington joined the Washington Huskies football team as the Recruiting Communications Coordinator.

Personal life
On June 20, 2014, Washington was arrested for speeding and driving with a suspended license, but was released after paying a fine.

References

External links
Washington Huskies bio
Chicago Bears bio
Georgia Bulldogs bio

1989 births
Living people
People from Hephzibah, Georgia
Players of American football from Georgia (U.S. state)
American football defensive ends
American football linebackers
Georgia Bulldogs football players
Chicago Bears players
Detroit Lions players
Washington Huskies football coaches